Thomas Harrington (born July 12, 2001) is an American baseball pitcher who plays in the Pittsburgh Pirates organization. He played college baseball for the Campbell Fighting Camels.

Amateur career
Harrington grew up in Sanford, North Carolina and attended Southern Lee High School. He went 4-0 with a 0.32 ERA and 54 strikeouts over  innings pitched as a junior. Harrington made one start before his senior season was canceled due to COVID-19. Harrington was also the starting quarterback on Southern Lee's football team.

Harrington joined the Campbell baseball team as a walk-on. He made 16 appearances with 14 starts as a freshman and was named the Big South Conference Freshman of the Year after going 6-3 with a 3.45 ERA. He was named the Big South Pitcher of the Year as a sophomore.

Professional career
The Pittsburgh Pirates selected Harrington 36th overall in the 2022 Major League Baseball draft. He signed with the Pirates on July 22, 2022, and received a $2,050,000 signing bonus.

References

External links

Campbell Fighting Camels bio

Living people
Baseball players from North Carolina
Baseball pitchers
Campbell Fighting Camels baseball players
2001 births